Rathbone is a surname which may refer to:

People
 Monroe Jackson Rathbone II (1900-1976), American businessman
 Augusta Rathbone (1897–1990), American artist
 Basil Rathbone (1892–1967), British actor
 Clyde Rathbone (born 1981), Australian rugby union player
 Eleanor Florence Rathbone (1872–1946), British M.P. and campaigner for women's rights
 Elfrida Rathbone (1871–1940), English educationist and philanthropist, cousin of Eleanor Rathbone
 Hannah Mary Rathbone (1798–1878), English writer
 Harold Steward Rathbone, co-founder of Della Robbia Pottery 
 Henry Rathbone (1837–1911), US Army major and diplomat present at Abraham Lincoln's assassination
 Henry Riggs Rathbone (1870–1928), US Congressman and son of Henry Rathbone
 Hugh Reynolds Rathbone (1862–1940), Liverpool merchant
 Jack Rathbone (born 1999), American ice hockey player
 Jackson Rathbone (born 1984), American actor
 John Rathbone (1910–40), English politician 
 John Rathbone (1750–1807), English painter
 Julian Rathbone (1935–2008), English novelist
 Justus H. Rathbone (1839–1889), founder of the Knights of Pythias
 Richard Rathbone (1788–1860), Liverpool merchant
 Tim Rathbone (1933–2002), English politician 
 William Rathbone II (1696–1746), founder of Rathbone Brothers, initially a Liverpool-based timber trading business
 William Rathbone III (1726–89), Liverpool merchant
 William Rathbone IV (1757–1809), Liverpool merchant
 William Rathbone V (1787–1868), Liverpool merchant
 William Rathbone VI (1819–1902), English politician

Fictional characters
 Oliver Rathbone, a lawyer in Anne Perry mystery novels about William Monk
 Henry Rathbone, father of Oliver Rathbone in Anne Perry mystery novels

See also
 William R. Rathvon (1854–1939), sometimes referred to as William V. Rathbone, only eyewitness to Lincoln's Gettysburg Address to leave an audio recording of the experience, Christian Science convert, public lecturer, board member, treasurer and author

English masculine given names
English-language surnames
Surnames of English origin